Monikangana Dutta is an Indian model and actress based in Mumbai. She is from Guwahati, Assam. She studied in Army Public School, Narangi, Guwahati and later graduated from the Matreyi College, University of Delhi.

Acting
She made her acting debut in the 2010 Indian film, Guzaarish directed by Sanjay Leela Bhansali and starring Aishwarya Rai and Hrithik Roshan.

References

External links
Official Website - Moni Kangana Dutta
IMG Models

Further reading
THE AUSTRALIAN - Moni Dutta is India's answer to Gemma Ward.
GUARDIAN UK - Vogue thinks big for Indian launch.
REDIFF - Lakme Fashion Week 2009.
GYANGURU - Kingfisher Calendar 2009.
NETWORK18 - Moni Dutta - Indian Supermodel.
REDIFF|GetAhead - Monikangana Dutta.
OUTLOOK INDIA - Ramp Scorchers.

Living people
Actresses in Assamese cinema
Female models from Assam
Actresses from Mumbai
Actresses from Guwahati
People from Kamrup Metropolitan district
Delhi University alumni
Year of birth missing (living people)